The 2016–17 season was Hull City's first season back in the Premier League following their promotion via the 2016 Football League play-offs in the previous season in their 113th year in existence. Along with the Premier League, the club competed in the FA Cup and EFL Cup.

Hull were relegated back to the Championship on 14 May 2017, following their 4–0 away defeat to Crystal Palace.

The season covered the period from 1 July 2016 to 30 June 2017.

Events

Steve Bruce
 On 1 July 2016 Tom Huddlestone signed a new two-year deal with the club.

 On 1 July 2016, goalkeeper Rory Watson went on a season-long loan to North Ferriby United.
 On 1 July 2016, goalkeeper Will Mannion was signed from AFC Wimbledon on a three-year contract.
 On 15 July 2016, in the pre-season friendly against Grimsby Town, Moses Odubajo sustained an injury early in the match, which was later diagnosed as a ruptured medial patellofemoral ligament. This would side-line him for about six months.

 On 19 July 2016, in the pre-season friendly against Mansfield Town, captain Michael Dawson left the field after about half-an-hour after a knock. This was later diagnosed as a medial knee ligament injury which would rule him out for approximately three months, leaving the team with only 13 fit senior players.
 On 20 July 2016, the club announced that takeover talks has been put on hold until after the close of the transfer window.
On 22 July 2016, the BBC reported that manager Steve Bruce had resigned from his position. This was later confirmed by the club, which also announced that Mike Phelan would act as caretaker manager.

Mike Phelan

 On 2 August 2016, the club sacked the first team coach Keith Bertschin.
 On 3 August 2016, Mohamed Diamé turned down a new contract with the club and signed a three-year deal with Newcastle United for an undisclosed fee.
 On 12 August 2016, Calaum Jahraldo-Martin signed for Oldham Athletic on a free transfer.
 On 17 August 2016, Sam Clucas signed a new three-year deal with the club.
 On 18 August 2016, Hull signed defender Bradley Maslen-Jones on a one-year contract from Peterborough United on a free transfer.
 On 30 August 2016, Hull signed goalkeeper David Marshall on a three-year deal from Cardiff City for an undisclosed fee, they also signed centre midfielder Ryan Mason on a three-year deal from Tottenham Hotspur for an undisclosed fee that broke the previous club record signing. The third signing of the day was centre forward Will Keane from Manchester United on a three-year deal for £1 million.
 On transfer deadline day, 31 August 2016, centre midfielder James Weir signed on a three-year deal from Manchester United for an undisclosed fee. Hull also brought in Dieumerci Mbokani on a season-long loan from Dynamo Kyiv and Markus Henriksen on loan from AZ until January 2017, when the loan became permanent.
 On 9 September 2016, caretaker manager Mike Phelan was named Premier League Manager of the Month for August.

 On 13 October 2016, Stephen Clemence left the club to take up a role at Aston Villa.
 On 13 October 2016, Mike Phelan became Hull's permanent head coach.
 On 24 October 2016, Neil McDonald was appointed as assistant head coach.

 On 1 November 2016, Gary Walsh left Hull and joined former manager Steve Bruce at Aston Villa as goalkeeper coach.
 On 7 November 2016, Jarrod Bowen signed a two-year extension to his contract with the club.
 On 17 November 2016, Tony Pennock was promoted to first team coach and Jon Beale took over as manager of the Tigers Academy.

 On 23 December 2016, Hull extended the contracts of six first team players, including winger Robert Snodgrass, defenders Michael Dawson, Andrew Robertson and Harry Maguire, midfielder Jake Livermore and striker Abel Hernández, to until the end of the 2017–18 season.

 On 1 January 2017 Jonathan Edwards and Harvey Rodgers moved on loan to Accrington Stanley for the remainder of the season.
 On 3 January 2017, head coach Mike Phelan was sacked by Hull City, less than three months after being made permanent. The decision was made following a 3–1 away defeat to West Bromwich Albion the previous day, leaving the Tigers bottom of the Premier League and three points adrift of safety. 
 On 4 January 2017, it was announced that assistant head coach, Neil McDonald, goalkeeping coach, Bobby Mimms, and head scout, Stan Ternent had left the club.

Marco Silva

 On 5 January 2017, the club announced the appointment of Marco Silva as the new head coach until the end of the season. He would bring his own back-room staff: assistant head coach João Pedro Sousa, first team coach Gonçalo Pedro and goalkeeping coach Hugo Oliveira.
 On 6 January 2016, Markus Henriksen's loan from AZ became permanent when he signed a -year deal.
On 13 January 2017, Evandro Goebel signed a -year deal with Hull City.
On 13 January 2017, Oumar Niasse signed a loan deal from Everton until the end of the 2016–17 season.
On 17 January 2017, the club announced that first team coach Tony Pennock had left the club.
On 17 January 2017, Johan Ter Horst moved on loan to York City until the end of 2016–17 season.
On 18 January 2017, Allan McGregor joined Cardiff City on loan until the end of the 2016–17 season.
 On 20 January 2017, Jake Livermore moved to West Bromwich Albion for an undisclosed fee.
 20 January 2017, Omar Elabdellaoui was signed on loan from Olympiacos for the remainder of the season.
On 22 January 2017, 13-minutes into the away match against Chelsea, Ryan Mason sustained a fractured skull after a clash of heads with defender Gary Cahill and was taken to St Mary's Hospital where he underwent surgery. He was discharged from hospital on 30 January 2017.

 On 23 January 2017, Lazar Marković signed on loan, from Liverpool, until the end of the season.
 On 27 January 2017, Robert Snodgrass signed a -year deal with West Ham United.
 On 31 January 2017, defender Andrea Ranocchia joined on loan from Internazionale for the rest of the season, Alfred N'Diaye signed on loan from Villarreal for the rest of the season, and Kamil Grosicki joined from Rennais for an undisclosed fee. Alex Bruce and James Weir moved on loan to Wigan Athletic for the rest of the season, Josh Clackstone moved on loan at Notts County until the end of the 2016–17 season, and the season-long loan of goalkeeper Rory Watson to North Ferriby United was terminated and he moved on a free transfer to Scunthorpe United.
 On 3 February 2017 goalkeeper Dušan Kuciak left on a free transfer to join Lechia Gdańsk.
 On 7 March 2017, Jon Beale was appointed as Academy Manager.

 On 25 May 2017, following relegation from the Premier League manager Marco Silva resigned.

 On 7 June 2017 Curtis Davies signed a 2-year contract with Derby County for an undisclosed fee.

Leonid Slutsky
 On 9 June 2017, the club announced the appointment of Leonid Slutsky as head coach.
 On 15 June 2017, Tony Pennock returned to Hull City as first-team coach.
 On 15 June 2017, Harry Maguire, signed a five-year deal with Leicester City for an undisclosed fee.
 On 16 June 2017, Harvey Rodgers signed a three-year deal with Fleetwood Town.
 On 20 June 2017, Lee Darnbrough was appointed Head of Recruitment, and Pat Mountain was appointed as Goalkeeping Coach.
 On 22 June 2017, the club announced a three-year partnership with the World Wide Fund for Nature to raise money towards a campaign to double the number of wild tigers by 2022.

Players

First team squad

Out on loan

Transfers

Transfers in

Transfers out

Loans in

Loans out

Pre-season
The Tigers will hold a  pre-season training camp in Portugal from 5 to 16 July 2016.

On 13 June 2015, Hull City announced a series of local pre-season friendlies against Grimsby Town, North Ferriby United, Mansfield Town, Scunthorpe United, Barnsley and Nottingham Forest. On 28 June 2016, two friendlies were announced to take place in Austria, against Çaykur Rizespor and Torino.

Competitions

Overall

Premier League

League table

Results summary

Results by matchday

Matches
On 15 June 2016, the fixtures for the season were announced and Hull started the season with a home tie against champions Leicester City on 13 August 2016. The season concluded with a home game against Tottenham Hotspur on 21 May 2017.

FA Cup

Hull enter the FA Cup in the third-round with the draw taking place at the BT Tower on 5 December 2016.
Hull were drawn at home to fellow Premier League team Swansea City. The match took place on 7 January 2017 at the KCOM Stadium and was the first game with new head coach Marco Silva in charge. The first half saw chances at both ends of the field but no one was able to break the deadlock. The second half started in the same way but soon after Abel Hernández was introduced, in place of Markus Henriksen, Hull broke the deadlock when Hernández turned in a cross from Shaun Maloney after 78-minutes. A goal deep in added time by substitute Josh Tymon, his first for the club, added to Hull's lead. At the other end Eldin Jakupović did his part in keeping a clean sheet for Hull who progressed to the fourth round after winning 2–0. The draw for the fourth round took place on 9 January 2017 and Hull were drawn away to Fulham.

The tie took place on 29 January 2017 at 12.30 p.m. at Craven Cottage. Fullam opened the scoring through former city player Sone Aluko  after 17-minutes. Hull struck back at the start of the second-half through Evandro Goebel, but Chris Martin restored Fulham's lead 5-minutes later. Fullam went further in front with goals from Ryan Sessegnon and 
Stefan Johansen. Tomáš Kalas tripped Andrew Robertson in the area to give Hull a penalty. Abel Hernández took the spot-kick which goalkeeper Marcus Bettinelli stopped, Hernández followed through but was fouled by Bettinelli with the awarding of a second penalty. Hernández took the second penalty that was tipped over the bar by Bettinelli. Hull exited the cup, losing 4–1.

EFL Cup

Hull City enter the competition in the second-round, the draw took place on 10 August 2016 and City were drawn away to Exeter City. The match took place on 
23 August 2016 with City giving debuts to Dušan Kuciak, Jarrod Bowen and Greg Olley. Exeter took the lead when Jake Taylor scored after 24-minutes. City responded when Adama Diomande hit the net a minute later, scoring a second goal 13 minutes from time. This was quickly followed by Robert Snodgrass hitting the net from a free kick to put City into the next round by a score of 3–1. The draw for the third-round took place the following day and Hull were drawn away to Stoke City. The match took place on 21 September 2016 at the Bet365 Stadium. Marko Arnautović opened the scoring for Stoke after 24 minutes, but Hull drew level just before half-time when Ryan Mason scored his first goal for the club. Stoke dominated the second-half, but in injury time, Markus Henriksen, on his debut, scored the winner for Hull.

The draw for the fourth-round, took place the same day and Hull were again drawn away to Bristol City. The match at Ashton Gate Stadium took place on 25 October 2016. Harry Maguire opened the scoring with a goal just before half-time for Hull, with Michael Dawson getting a second just after the break. Bristol left it late to get on the scoreboard when Lee Tomlin scored in extra-time, and Tammy Abraham went close just before the final whistle. Hull progressed to the fifth round for the second year in a row. Later The Football Association charged Adama Diomande with violent conduct for an incident with Marlon Pack. Diomande accepted the charge and was given a three-match ban. The draw for the quarter-final took place the following day and Hull were drawn at home to Newcastle United.

The match took place on 29 November 2016 at the KCOM Stadium, and both teams missed several chances to score and with a minute to go of normal time Hull's Dieumerci Mbokani was sent off, but this failed to break the deadlock. Extra time was played and Newcastle United had the extra player advantage giving ex-Hull striker Mohamed Diamé the chance to take advantage with a goal eight-minutes into the first period. Hull responded immediately through Robert Snodgrass who levelled the score a minute later. Newcastle United continued to press but could not break the deadlock and the game ended 1–1 after extra time. The game went to penalties, Jonjo Shelvey started for Newcastle but his shot was saved by Eldin Jakupović, Robert Snodgrass converted for Hull, Dwight Gayle's attempt went over the bar while Michael Dawson scored, Christian Atsu put one in for Newcastle before Tom Huddlestone converted his attempt. Newcastle had to score to stay in the match but Yoan Gouffran's attempt was saved by Jakupović and Hull progressed 3–1 on penalties to the semi-final for the first time in their history. The draw for the semi-finals took place the following day and Hull were drawn against Manchester United, the game to be played over two-legs in January 2017.

The first leg took place on 10 January 2017 at Old Trafford. Hull had a depleted side because of injuries and sickness and could only name six substitutes; Tom Huddlestone took the captain's role in the absence of Michael Dawson. Manchester United pressed in the first-half but were unable to make a break through. Markus Henriksen sustained a shoulder injury after 16-minutes and was replaced by Abel Hernández. In the second-half Manchester broke the deadlock after 11-minutes Juan Mata tapped in from close range and with 3-minutes to go Marouane Fellaini doubled the score.

In the second leg, played on 26 January 2017, although Hull managed a 2–1 victory thanks to goals from Tom Huddlestone and Oumar Niasse, Paul Pogba's goal in between them meant they lost the tie 3–2 on aggregate and were eliminated.

Statistics

Appearances

|-
|colspan="12"|Players who played for Hull City but were subsequently sold by the club:

Note: Appearances shown after a "+" indicate player came on during course of match.

Disciplinary record

Top scorers

Kits
On 14 July 2016 the away kit of black with amber trim made by Umbro was revealed. On 25 July 2016 the club announced that SportPesa, the Kenyan on-line gaming company, would be the new shirt sponsor having signed a three-year deal that was the largest in the club's history. Later the same day the new home kit was on display with black and amber vertical stripes, complemented by black shorts and amber socks. A third kit, of purple cactus, was revealed on 14 October 2016 ahead of the away game against Bournemouth where it was used.

Awards
The annual awards for the club saw Sam Clucas pick-up the Player of the Year and Goal of the Season, for his goal on 22 April 2017 against Watford.
Harry Maguire picked up Players’ Player of the Year and 
Fans’ Player of the Year awards. Josh Tymon took the award for Young Player of the Year.

Notes

References

Hull City A.F.C. seasons
Hull City
2010s in Kingston upon Hull